The 10th  Pennsylvania House of Representatives District is located in southeastern Pennsylvania. Its current representative-elect is Amen Brown.

District profile
The 10th District is located in Philadelphia County and includes the following areas:

Philadelphia (part)
Ward 04 (part)
Division 01
Division 07
Division 08
Division 12
Ward 06 (part)
Division 01
Division 02
Division 03
Division 04
Division 05
Division 06
Division 07
Division 08
Division 09
Division 10
Division 11
Division 12
Division 16
Ward 08 (part)
Division 17
Division 18
Division 19
Division 22
Division 23
Division 29
Ward 24
Ward 44 (part)
Division 03
Division 04
Division 06
Division 08
Division 09
Division 10
Division 13
Division 14
Division 15
Division 16
Ward 60 (part)
Division 04
Division 05
Division 06
Division 07
Division 11
Division 14
Division 15
Division 16
Division 17
Division 18
Division 19
Division 20
Division 21
Division 22

Representatives

Recent election results

References

Sources

External links
District map from the United States Census Bureau
Pennsylvania House Legislative District Maps from the Pennsylvania Redistricting Commission.  
Population Data for District 10 from the Pennsylvania Redistricting Commission.

Government of Beaver County, Pennsylvania
Government of Butler County, Pennsylvania
Government of Lawrence County, Pennsylvania
10